The Great Northern Railway (Ireland) (GNRI) VS class steam locomotives were 4-4-0 three-cylinder simple expansion steam locomotives built in 1948 by Beyer, Peacock and Company. They were procured in order to operate the Enterprise train service between Dublin and Belfast and were the last series of steam engines ordered by the company.

Design 
The locomotives of class VS, designed by Mcintosh, were very similar to the compound locomotives of GNRI Class V, built in 1932 by Beyer, Peacock and Company. Unlike the latter, however, they had only simple expansion steam engines with Walschaerts valve gear. Their wheel arrangement was due to the restricted space in the Dundalk workshops.

Roster 
Five locomotives of this type were built. Their works numbers were 6961 to 6965, their running numbers were 206 to 210. They were named after the rivers Liffey, Boyne, Lagan, Foyle, and Erne.

The VS class shared working the heaviest and fastest expresses on the Dublin to Belfast main line with Class V compounds; and were noted for use on the non-stop Enterprise express services.

In 1958 with the split up of the cross border GNRI Nos. 206, 207, and 209 went to CIÉ whilst acquiring a suffix of N.  At the same time Nos. 208 and 210  became 58 and 59 under the Ulster Transport Authority (UTA).  CIÉ sold No. 207N to the UTA in 1963 and utilised on both main line and suburban services from Belfast.

All were taken out of service by 1965, none surviving into preservation.

References 

4-4-0 locomotives
5 ft 3 in gauge locomotives
V
Steam locomotives of Northern Ireland
Steam locomotives of Ireland
Passenger locomotives
Railway locomotives introduced in 1948
Scrapped locomotives
2′B h3 locomotives